The Poor Simp is a 1920 American silent comedy film directed by Victor Heerman and starring Owen Moore, Nell Craig, and Harry L. Rattenberry.

Plot
As described in a film magazine review, Melville G. Carruthers, a wealthy young man, is in love with Grace Adams. He plucks up enough courage to propose to her after knowing her for a long time, but makes a fiasco of it when the crucial time comes. Another admirer enters and monopolizes her attention. Strolling into the slums, Melville meets Sadie Kelly, gets into a rowdy fight, is bumped on the head, and his mind temporarily affected. Grace and her mother, being notified, hurry to his apartment only to find him having his head being gently bathed by Sadie. The two misunderstand the situation and leave indignantly. After a number of complications and humorous situations, it all comes out right and Melville makes a successful proposal after all.

Cast

References

Bibliography
 Brent E. Walker. Mack Sennett’s Fun Factory: A History and Filmography of His Studio and His Keystone and Mack Sennett Comedies, with Biographies of Players and Personnel. McFarland, 2013.

External links

 

1920 films
1920 comedy films
1920s English-language films
American silent feature films
Silent American comedy films
American black-and-white films
Films directed by Victor Heerman
Selznick Pictures films
1920s American films